The 2021 Argentina Open is a men's tennis tournament played on outdoor clay courts. It is the 24th edition of the ATP Buenos Aires event, and part of the ATP Tour 250 series of the 2021 ATP Tour. It take place in Buenos Aires, Argentina, from March 1 through 7, 2021.

Finals

Singles 

  Diego Schwartzman def.  Francisco Cerúndolo, 6–1, 6–2.

Doubles 

  Tomislav Brkić /  Nikola Ćaćić def.  Ariel Behar /  Gonzalo Escobar, 6–3, 7–5.

Points and prize money

Point distribution

Prize money 

*per team

Singles main draw entrants

Seeds

1 Rankings are as of February 22, 2021

Other entrants 
The following players received wildcards into the singles main draw:
  Thiago Agustín Tirante
  Facundo Díaz Acosta
  Holger Vitus Nødskov Rune

The following players received special exemptions into the singles main draw:
  Facundo Bagnis
  Juan Manuel Cerúndolo

The following players received entry from the qualifying draw:
  Francisco Cerúndolo
  Lukáš Klein
  Jaume Munar
  Sumit Nagal

Withdrawals
Before the tournament
  Pablo Cuevas → replaced by  Gianluca Mager
  Pedro Martínez → replaced by  Andrej Martin
  Guido Pella → replaced by  Roberto Carballés Baena

Doubles main draw entrants

Seeds

1 Rankings are as of February 22, 2021

Other entrants
The following pairs received wildcards into the doubles main draw:
  Francisco Cerúndolo /  Federico Coria
  Facundo Díaz Acosta /  Thiago Agustín Tirante

Withdrawals 
Before the tournament
  Marco Cecchinato /  Guido Pella → replaced by  Roberto Carballes Baena /  Salvatore Caruso
  Pablo Cuevas /  Oliver Marach → replaced by  Oliver Marach /  Luis David Martínez
  Pablo Andújar /  Pedro Martinez → replaced by  Pablo Andújar /  Jaume Munar
During the tournament
  André Göransson /  Thiago Monteiro

References

External links 

 

Argentina Open
Argentina Open
ATP Buenos Aires
Argentina Open